Cumings is a surname. Notable people with the surname include:

Alison Cumings (born 1961), English squash player
Bruce Cumings (born 1943), American historian, professor, lecturer, and author
Eartha Cumings (born 1999), Scottish footballer

See also
Cummings (disambiguation)